Jean de Pauly (Albania, 1860 – Lyon, 1903) was the translator of French editions of the portions of the Talmud and the first complete translation of the Zohar. He sometimes signed his works "Pavly."
Born in Albania, he earned his doctorat ès lettres in Palermo, then lived at Basel, Lyon, where he appears to have been a teacher at the School of the Sacred Heart, then Rome, Orleans, Turin, before returning to die in poverty in Lyon. In his last years he was occupied with the translation of the Zohar, proposed to Pauly by France's biggest paper manufacturer, the Catholic Émile Lafuma-Giraud, and published 1906-11. His Zohar translation was criticised by Gershom Scholem for falsifying the book’s content.

Works
 Chosen-Mispat: Oder Civil und Strafrecht Des Judenthums (1893) Jean De Pavly
 Le Faux Pape ou les effrontés fin de siècle stigmatisés et livrés à l'indignation et au mépris des honnêtes gens Jean de Pavly, 1895 Marseille, Imprimerie méridionale, 32p.
 La Cité juive  1898
 Le Manuel du ménage israélite 1899 - a mixture of serious and fantasy.
 (extracts from) Le Talmud de Babylone 1888 and 1900
 Sepher ha-Zohar (Le livre de la splendeur): Jean de Pavly. posth. 1906-1911
 Paul Vulliaud ed. and notes. Etudes et correspondence de Jean de Pauly relatives au Sepher ha-Zohar. Paris 1933

References

1860 births
1903 deaths
Translators to French
Talmudists
French male writers
19th-century translators
19th-century male writers